Half of a Yellow Sun is a novel by Nigerian author Chimamanda Ngozi Adichie. Published in 2006 by 4th Estate in London, the novel tells the story of the Biafran War through the perspective of the characters Olanna, Ugwu, and Richard.

It received critical acclaim and won the Women's Prize for Fiction in 2007. In 2013, it was adapted into a film of the same name.

Plot

The novel takes place in Nigeria prior to and during the Nigerian Civil War (1967–70). The effect of the war is shown through the relationships of five people's lives including the twin daughters of an influential businessman, a professor, a British expat, and a Nigerian houseboy. After Biafra's declaration of secession, the lives of the main characters drastically change and are torn apart by the brutality of the civil war and decisions in their personal lives.

The book jumps between events that took place during the early and late 1960s, when the war took place, and extends until the end of the war. In the early 1960s, the main characters are introduced: Ugwu, a 13-year-old village boy who moves in with Odenigbo, to work as his houseboy. Odenigbo frequently entertains intellectuals to discuss the political turmoil in Nigeria. Life changes for Ugwu when Odenigbo's girlfriend, Olanna, moves in with them. Ugwu forms a strong bond with both of them, and is a very loyal houseboy. Olanna has a twin sister, Kainene, a woman with a dry sense of humor, tired by the pompous company she runs for her father. Her lover Richard is an English writer who goes to Nigeria to explore Igbo-Ukwu art.

Jumping four years ahead, trouble is brewing between the Hausa and the Igbo people and hundreds of people die in massacres, including Olanna's beloved auntie and uncle. A new republic, called Biafra, is created by the Igbo. As a result of the conflict, Olanna, Odenigbo, their young daughter, whom they refer to only as "Baby", and Ugwu are forced to flee Nsukka, which is the university town and the major intellectual hub of the new nation. They finally end up in the refugee town of Umuahia, where they suffer and struggle due to food shortages, the constant air raids and the environment of paranoia. There are also allusions to a conflict between Olanna and Kainene, Richard and Kainene and between Olanna and Odenigbo.

When the novel jumps back to the early 1960s, we learn that Odenigbo has slept with a village girl, Amala, who then has his baby. Olanna is furious at his betrayal, and sleeps with Richard in a moment of liberation. She goes back to Odenigbo and when they later learn that Amala refused to keep her newborn daughter, Olanna decides that they would keep her.

During the war, Olanna, Odenigbo, Baby, and Ugwu live with Kainene and Richard, where Kainene was running a refugee camp. Their situation is hopeless, as they have no food nor medicine. Kainene decides to trade across enemy lines, but does not return, even after the end of the war a few weeks later. The book ends ambiguously, with the reader not knowing if Kainene lives.

Characters

Ugwu – The novel starts and ends with Ugwu. He is a village boy from Opi who later becomes a servant in Odenigbo's house. Under Odenigbo and Olanna's guidance, Ugwu is able to continue his education and his literary skills progress throughout the novel. He tries to maintain contact with his mother and sister, Anulika, back in his home village, and is constantly looking out for his mother's health and wellbeing.  His free time is often dominated by his love interests, which include Nnesinachi, Eberechi, and Chinyere. His life is violently interrupted when he is forcibly conscripted into the Biafran Army. There, he witnesses and participates in gruesome battles and a rape he was pressured into committing.

Odenigbo – Odenigbo starts the novel as Professor of Mathematics at Nsukka University. His strong opinions result in some characters labeling him as a "revolutionary". He favors socialism and tribalism to capitalism and Pan-Africanism or nationalism. After the war forces him to vacate his position at Nsukka University, Odenigbo becomes active in the war cause under Manpower Directorate .
His personal life is dominated by his relationship and later marriage to Olanna. He is the father of Baby, though Amala, not Olanna, is Baby's biological mother. Odenigbo also has a strong, albeit turbulent, relationship with his mother. "Mama" affects his relationship with Olanna, and Mama's death starts Odenigbo down a path of alcoholism and depression.

Olanna – Olanna is one of three characters through which the novel is told. She is the daughter of Chief Ozobia and twin of Kainene. Olanna was raised in Nigeria, and later attended university in the United Kingdom. She is described as “illogically beautiful,” and her appearance often dictates how others treat her. For example, her parents try to offer sex with her as a bribe to help secure business deals. Consequently, her connection with her parents is weak and she gravitates towards her Aunt Ifeka and Uncle Mbaezi in Kano. Mohammed is her ex-boyfriend and Odenigbo is her husband, and she is the adopted mother of Baby. 
Professionally, she is a Professor of Sociology at Nsukka University before the war begins. She later works as a school teacher in Umuahia and finally helps her sister care for refugees in Orlu.

Kainene – Kainene, Olanna's twin, seems to be at first very different from Olanna. She is the type of strong-headed woman, independent, cold, very calculated. Kainene lives in Port Harcourt, where she runs her father's business. Her father, very proud of her, tells one of his friends that she is "not just like a son, she is like two". In the beginning of the war, she is a war profiteer. However, after she witnesses the war's cruelty, she changes completely as a character and instead of running her father's business, she runs a refugee camp. She remains fearless and in the end decides to trade with the enemy, putting her life at risk.

Richard Churchill – Richard is an English writer who comes to Nigeria to explore Igbo-Ukwu art. At first he associates with other expats, especially Susan who becomes his girlfriend. However, once he meets Kainene at one of the parties Susan drags him to, he becomes fascinated with her. Richard moves to Nsukka where he teaches at the Nsukka University and attempts to write a book about the Igbo-Ukwu art. Olanna invites him to be part of Odenigbo's circle of intellectuals. Richard is glad to witness Biafra's birth, thinking it would actually make him Biafran. He starts writing a book about the war, but soon realizes that it is not his story to tell. Adichie has said in an interview that the idea of Richard came from Frederick Forsyth, a staunch supporter of Biafra: "Richard isn't at all like him, of course, but just the sense of an Englishman who became more Biafran than Biafrans themselves, was really an idea that came from him, Forsyth."

Ugwu's aunty – Cleaner at Nsukka University, she introduces Ugwu to Master Odenigbo.

Anulika – Anulika is Ugwu's sister. She is preparing to get married before the war, but a war-time tragedy changes her plans.

Nnesinachi – Ugwu's first crush from his village of Opi. Ugwu and Nnesinachi reconnect after the war.

Ugwu's mother – Ugwu's mother suffers from illness in Ugwu's home village of Opi. She seeks treatment in Nsukka with Odenigbo's help. Ugwu often worries about her during the war.

Miss Adebayo –Yoruba professor at Nsukka University. Sexual tension between Miss Adebayo and Odenigbo create an awkward relationship between Miss Adebayo and Olanna. As the war starts to break out, Miss Adebayo's ethnicity creates a gap between her and other professors.

Dr. Patel – Indian Professor at Nsukka University. Dr. Patel is a friend of Odenigbo and Olanna.

Professor Lehman –  American Professor at Nsukka University. Professor Lehman's views are often criticized by Odenigbo.

Professor Ezeka – Professor at Nsukka University who later becomes Director of Mobilization in the Biafran Army.

Okeoma – A friend of Olanna and Odenigbo in Nsukka. Okeoma is a renowned poet, as one point called, “the voice of our generation.” He cites Olanna as his inspiration. Okeoma later becomes an officer in the Biafran Army and stops writing poems.

Edna – Olanna's neighbor in Nsukka. Edna is an African-American woman with strong opinions on racial and gender injustice.

Jomo – Jomo works as the gardener at both Richard's house and Odenigbo's house in Nsukka. He is one of Ugwu's first friends in Nsukka and is also often feuding with his rival, Harrison.

Harrison – Richard's houseboy. Harrison's talkative nature at first annoys Richard, and later gets him into trouble.

Chinyere – Works in a house near Master's in Nsukka. Maintains late night visits with Ugwu until the war starts.

Mama (Odenigbo's mother) – A village woman from Abba. She is opposed to the relationship between Odenigbo and Olanna because they are not officially married (no bride price paid yet) plus Olanna is an unnatural woman.

Amala – A village girl who works for Mama, Odenigbo's mother. To break up Olanna and Odenigbo Mama makes Amala sleep with Odenigbo. Amala gets pregnant but after giving birth, she refuses to take the child and sends her back to Mama.

Chief Okonji – Friend of Olanna and Kainene's parents. Chief Okonji claims a romantic interest in Olanna, but is thoroughly rebuffed by Olanna.

Chief Ozobia – Prominent businessman in Lagos and father to Olanna and Kainene. Chief Ozobia manipulates his daughters for financial benefit. He also keeps a mistress, and eventually leaves Nigeria during the war.

Olanna and Kainene's mother – Chief Ozobia's wife and mother of Olanna and Kainene. She does not have a strong relationship with her daughters, and her marriage with Chief Ozobi might be described as a pretense.

Uncle Mbaezi – Olanna's uncle, he is the brother of Olanna's mother. He lives with his family in Kano where he founded the Igbo Union Grammar School.

Aunty Ifeka – Uncle Mbaezi's wife. Aunty Ifeka gives guidance to Olanna, who isn't very close to her own mother.

Arize – Olanna's cousin, she is Uncle Mbaezi and Aunty Ifeka's daughter. Arize is eager find a husband and get married. Like her parents, she looks up to Olanna.

Mohammed – Olanna's ex-boyfriend. He is a handsome Hausa man. Even after she leaves him for Odenigbo, they remain on good terms and she frequently visits him until the war starts. During the war, he writes her letters but they feel very distanced.

Baby –  Olanna and Odenigbo's daughter. Amala is Baby's birth mother, but refuses to keep her. When Olanna sees her, she decides to adopt her. Baby's real name is Chiamaka, which means "God is beautiful." Kainene picked it but it is rarely used.

Susan Grenville-Pitts – Initially Richard's girlfriend. She lives in Nigeria but mainly associates with other expatriates or upper class Nigerians. Her racism towards Nigerians as well as her possessiveness towards Richard emerge periodically throughout the novel.

Major Madu – Lifelong friend of Kainene. Major Madu serves in first the Nigerian army and later in the Biafran army. He and Richard's relationship is strained due to the uncertainty of Madu's role in Kainene's life.

Special Julius – Army contractor. He becomes a frequent visitor of Odenigbo when they are in Umuahia.

Ekwenugo – Member of the Science group in the Biafran army. Ekwenugo meets Olanna and Odenigbo in Umuahia.

Mrs Muokelu – Co-teacher with Olanna at Umuahia. Olanna finds Mrs. Muokelu as manly and slightly judgmental. Mrs. Muokelu eventually stops teaching and starts trading across enemy lines.

Okoromadu – An old acquaintance of Olanna's, Okoromadu helps her get emergency supplies for baby in Umuahia.

Eberechi – Ugwu's love interest in Umuahia. Eberechi is exploited for her parents’ benefit.

Alice – Odenigbo and Olanna's neighbor at their second place of residence in Umuahia. Alice seeks refuge in Umahia after being tricked by an Army Colonel. She is known as a recluse and avid pianist. Mystery shrouds her relationship with Odenigbo.

Father Marcel – Helps coordinate refugee relief with Kainene in Orlu. Father Marcel is later accused of impropriety by some of the refugees.

High-Tech – A young soldier and leader of Ugwu's reconnaissance unit. High tech's name refers to his commanders claiming he is more useful than a "high technology spying gadget".

Themes

War
The Nigerian Civil War (or the "Nigerian-Biafran War") started on 6 July 1967 and ended on 13 January 1970. The war broke out due to political and ethnic struggles, partly caused by the numerous attempts of the southeastern provinces of Nigeria to secede and form the Republic of Biafra. Political conflict between the Igbo, Yoruba, Hausa and Fulani people erupted into two deadly military coups. The Igbo tried to break away from Nigeria to become the Republic of Biafra, but were met with little support. From 1968 onward, the war fell into a form of deadlock, with Nigerian forces unable to make significant advances into the remaining areas of Biafran control. The Nigerian government cut off humanitarian aid to Biafra, resulting in hundreds of thousands of civilians dying from starvation and disease. Many lives and resources were lost during the war, including Adichie's grandfathers; and even today there are still tensions between the different ethnic and religious groups of Nigeria.

The story in Half of a Yellow Sun centres on the war. Adichie grew up in the aftermath the war: "The need to write about it came from growing up in its shadow. This thing that I didn't quite understand was my legacy. It hovered over everything." She has stated she believes that many of the issues that caused the war remain today. She further commented that the war is talked about "in uninformed and unimaginative ways", and that the war is as important to the Igbo people her book features today as it was then. Because none of the major political events were changed in the book, Adichie said that the book contained "emotional truth", and that the book showed the war had a significant impact upon the people of Nigeria.

Politics and identity in post-colonial Africa
The social gatherings at Odenigbo's house are full of debates on Africa's political future. Here, the usefulness of various forms of African governance are discussed amongst the Nigerian intelligentsia. One particularly noteworthy debate involves Odenigbo defending the tribe as the ideal unit for African, as other characters stress the need for pan-Africanism or nationalism. He is quoted as proclaiming: "the only authentic identity for the African is the tribe...I am Nigerian because a white man created Nigeria and gave me that identity. I am black because the white man constructed black to be as different as possible from his white. But I was Igbo before the white man came."

Role of Westerners in post-colonial Africa
Although there is a clear reference to Western influence in the Biafran War, a more subtle examination is found in Richard's character. Richard, although with good intentions, tries too hard to be part of first Nigeria, and later Biafra. His fascination with the culture and his wish to be part of Biafra leads to him speaking for Biafrans by attempting to write two novels, one about the art, and the second one about the Biafran war. Richard is unable to complete either, and concludes that these are not his stories to tell. However, he is effective when he writes about the war for the Western press, which actually helps Biafra's cause. Adichie herself has said in an interview, that "maybe [Richard's character] is my subtle way of slipping in my politics that maybe it's time that Africans wrote about Africa."

Relevance of academia in everyday life
Many of the main characters in Half of a Yellow Sun are professors, including Olanna and Odenigbo. Odenigbo regularly hosts fellow professors from Nsukka University for political discussions on the weekends. Over the course of the novel, Half of a Yellow Sun seems to criticize both these professors and their opinions. It does this by juxtaposing the high-minded political opinions of Odenigbo and his companions from the "Early Sixties" sections against the political realities of the "Late Sixties" sections. The novel also uses the same professors from the "Early Sixties" sections and puts them in the "Late Sixties" sections. Also, Kainene's business mind helps her successfully run a refugee camp, whereas Olanna and Odenigbo seem ineffectual. Adichie seems to emphasize the reality of action over the ephemeral nature of opinion.

Modus operandi of Western journalism
Half of a Yellow Sun is heavily critical of the Western media's coverage of the Biafran War. The rule of Western journalism is obvious when Richard meets with the foreign journalists: "Richard exhaled. It was like somebody sprinkling pepper on his wound: Thousands of Biafrans were dead, and this man wanted to know if there was anything new about one dead white man. Richard would write about this, the rule of Western journalism: One hundred dead black people equal one dead white person." Since it is clear that white journalists have a greater influence, Madu asks Richard to write about the war for the Western press: "They will take what you write more seriously because you are white. If you really want to contribute, this is the way that you can. The world has to know the truth of what is happening, because they simply cannot remain silent while we die."

Women empowerment
Although Half of a Yellow Sun does not have the conflict between a woman and patriarchy typical of feminist novels, it does show the agency of women. In one of the pivotal moments, Olanna is disappointed by Odenigbo's betrayal and goes to Kano to seek comfort from her family there. Aunty Ifeka says: “You must never behave as if your life belongs to a man. Your life belongs to you and you alone.” Later on, even after forgiving Odenigbo, she confronts him about his betrayal and does not accept him justifying his actions by blaming his mother. On the other hand, when Olanna's father cheats on her mother, Olanna's mother does not confront him about it. She only asks Olanna to tell her father to do it more subtly.

Marriage
Marriage is a recurrent theme in Half of a Yellow Sun. For the most part of the novel, Olanna and Kainene both live with men without it being question of marriage. Olanna refuses to get married many times at first, fearing that marriage would "flatten [their bond] to a prosaic partnership." It is only during the war, when Odenigbo is invited to a town meeting in Abba and Olanna is not, that they talk again about marriage. Olanna accepts, but the wedding is done hastily and is interrupted by an air raid. Although Richard never asks Kainene to marry him, he does mention his wish for her to be his wife many times. Arize who is poor and uneducated, admires Olanna for postponing marriage but waits eagerly for a husband herself: "It is only women that know too much Book like you who can say that, Sister. If people like me who don't know book wait too long, we will expire." Adichie seems to be saying that marriage is a pragmatic choice and women who don't need to get married might choose not to even when their boyfriends are willing.

Reception

Half of a Yellow Sun received the 2007 Women's Prize for Fiction. The award is given annually for the best original full-length novel written by a woman in English; Adichie's prize amounted to £30,000. The novel was well received by critics and included in the New York Timess "100 Most Notable Books of the Year".

In a review for The Seattle Times, Mary Brennan called the book "a sweeping story that provides both a harrowing history lesson and an engagingly human narrative". The New York Times had a more mixed review of the book, noting that "at times Adichie's writing is too straightforward, the novel's pace too slack" but also that "whenever she touches on her favorite themes — loyalty and betrayal — her prose thrums with life." The Washington Post states: “Chimamanda Ngozi Adichie certainly lives up to the hype in her second novel, Half a Yellow Sun. She wowed us with this transcendent tale about war, loyalty, brutality, and love in modern Africa. While painting a searing portrait of the tragedy that took place in Biafra during the 1960s, her story finds its true heart in the intimacy of three ordinary lives buffeted by the winds of fate. Her tale is hauntingly evocative and impossible to forget.” Rob Nixon's review addressed the historical side of the novel: “Half of a Yellow Sun takes us inside ordinary lives laid waste by the all too ordinary unraveling of nation states. When an acquaintance of Olanna's turns up at a refugee camp, she notices that – he was thinner and lankier than she remembered and looked as though he would break in two if he sat down abruptly. – It's a measure of Adichie's mastery of small things – and of the mess the world is in – that we see that man arrive, in country after country, again and again and again.” Writing in The Guardian, Maya Jaggi called the book "a landmark novel". Aïssatou Sidimé from San Antonio Express-News called Adichie's writing "alluring and revelatory, eloquent, prize-winning Nigerian writer Chimamanda Ngozi Adichie is quickly proving herself to be fearless in the tradition of the great African writers." Nigerian writer Chinua Achebe commented: "We do not usually associate wisdom with beginners, but here is a new writer endowed with the gift of ancient storytellers," and said about Adichie: "She is fearless, or she would not have taken on the intimidating horror of Nigeria's civil war."

In 2019, Half of a Yellow Sun was ranked by The Guardian as the 10th best book since 2000.

On 5 November 2019, the BBC News included Half of a Yellow Sun on its list of the 100 most influential novels.

In November 2020, Half of a Yellow Sun was voted the best book to have won the Women's Prize for Fiction in its 25-year history.

In 2022, Half of a Yellow Sun was included on the "Big Jubilee Read" list of 70 books by Commonwealth authors, selected to celebrate the Platinum Jubilee of Elizabeth II.

Adaptation

A film adaptation written by playwright Biyi Bandele premiered at the Toronto International Film Festival in late 2013, and had its worldwide release in 2014. The film stars Chiwetel Ejiofor and Thandiwe Newton.

Bibliography

References

External links

Podcast of Chimamanda Ngozi Adichie discussing Half of a Yellow Sun on the BBC's World Book Club
The Archetypal Search for Kainene: Adichie's Half of a Yellow Sun: The Nigerian State and the Lost Biafran Dream by Abayomi Awelewa, Leeds African Studies Bulletin, 78 (2017).

Alfred A. Knopf books
Igboland in fiction
Nigerian English-language novels
2006 Nigerian novels
Nigerian novels adapted into films
Novels by Chimamanda Ngozi Adichie
Novels set during the Nigerian Civil War
Novels set in Nigeria
Novels set in the 1960s
Postcolonial novels
War novels
Women's Prize for Fiction-winning works